The Honolulu Film Awards (HFA) are international film awards granted to independent films in Honolulu, Oahu, Hawaii, United States.

Winners

2012
Grand Jury Award: Irvine Welsh's Ecstasy (Director: Rob Heydon)
Special Jury Award: Menschenliebe (Director: Alexander Tuschinski)
Special Jury Award: Viti (Fiji) (Director: Dustin Bancroft)
Special Jury Award: Strings (Director: Mark Dennis & Ben Foster)
Jury Price: Strings (Director: Mark Dennis & Ben Foster)
Jury Price: Volunteer (Director: Mariah Wilson)
Jury Price: Marathon Boy (Director: Gemma Atwal)
Jury Price: 40 West (Director: Dana Packard)
Best Feature Film: A Little Bit Zombie (Director: Casey Walker)
Best of Hawaii: Go for Broke! Memories of Hawai'ian Japanese'Niseis (Director: Hiroyuki Matsumoto)
Best Animation: 8 Second Dance (Director: Trey Moya / Howard Cook)
Best Biographiy: Randy Parsons: American Luthier (Director: David Aldrich)
Best Comedy: Hi Honey (Director: Peter A. M. Henderson)
Best Coming of Age: The Green Rush (Director: Jason Edwards)
Best Crime: Dot Got Shot (Director: Carlos Ramos Jr. / Honey Lauren)
Best Director: Wendy Elkin (Painting Bolinas)
Best Documentary Feature: Italy: Love It or Leave It (Director: Gustav Hofer / Luca Ragazzi)
Best Documentary Short: Birds of the Rainforest (Director: Jim Denny)
Best Educational Film: Though I'm Not Perfect (Director: Stacey Sargeant)
Best Environmental Film: Carbon for Water (Director: Evan Abramson / Carmen Elsa / Lopez Abramson)
Best Family Film: Giant Monsters Attack Hawaii! (Director: Dane Neves)
Best Foreign Film: Tokyo Playboy Club (Director: Yosuke Okuda)
Best Historical Film: 7 Years Underground: A 60's Tale (Director: Jason M. Solomon)
Best Independent Short: Slip Cue (Director: Robin Kupferman)
Best Music Video: Oh Luv (Director: MAGZ Magda Sztompka)
Best Sci-Fi: The Kook (Director: Nat Livingston / Johnson Gregory Mitnick)
Best Screenplay: Nefarious: Merchant of Souls (Director: Benjamin Nolot)
Best Short Film: Best Man (Director: Edward Figueroa)
Best Television Pilot: Actors Anonymous (Director: Bryan Stratte)
Best Thriller: Fractured Minds (Director: Frank Battiston)
Best Action Sports: Still By Numbers (Director: Bec Kingma)
Best Drama: Masque (Director: Robert Hatch)
Best Mockumentary: Roomies (Director: Christabel Savalas)
Best Student Film: After School (Director: John Wakayama Carey)

2012 Gold Kahuna Winners

Feature films  
 Bedouin - Directed By: Igor Voloshin 
 Brush - Directed By: Shiyan Zheng  
 Currency - Directed By: Brad Rosier  
 Five Hours South - Directed By: Mark Bacci  
 Off Shore - Directed By: Sven J. Matten  
 Red Scare - Directed By: William Dautrick  
 Seven Eves - Directed By: Mark Nordhagen  
 Weeding Out - Directed By: Georgy Kao

Action Sports Films  
 Silent Night - Directed By: Bec Kingma

Animation Films  
 5 Minutes Each - Directed By:Vojin Vasovic 
 The Dream of Ore Magi - Directed By: Evan Curtis

Documentary Films  
 47 Miles: March to Destiny - Directed By: Gregg Cummins 
 Between Today and Tomorrow - Directed By: Junko Kobayashi 
 Boom Varietal - Directed By: Sky Pinnick 
 Flight To The Wall - Directed By: Bill Matson 
 Knocking on the Devil's Door - Directed By: Gary Null 
 Orchids - Directed By: Phoebe Hart 
 The World's Most Fashionable Prison - Directed By: Chun Kit Mak 
 Too Sane For This World - Directed By: William Davenport 
 Valmara - Directed By: Christoph Vieth 
 Wigge's Tauschrausch - Directed By: Michael Wigge

Hawaii Films  
 Breathe Life - Directed By: Antje Beyen

Music videos  
 Chapel Song - Directed By: Matthew Mills  
 Eye of the Storm - Directed By: Christopher Alender  
 Mutant Calculator - Directed By: Alexander Tuschinski

Screenplay Competition 
 
 Apparition - Written By: Roi Costa  
 Devil's Valley Justice - Written By: Harold Brown  
 Dirty Business - Written By: Haik Hakobian  
 Full-Metal Alchemist - Written By: Mathew Brengman  
 Loveband - Written By: Nicola Pedrozzi  
 Lucky Numbers - Written By: Aimee Garabics

Short films 
 
 2-Star - Directed By: Jacob Halajian  
 Absent - Directed By: Richie Siegel  
 Delivered - Directed By: Charles Willis  
 Just Three Words - Directed By: Graeme Finlayson  
 Mary and Bill - Directed By: Andrew Napier  
 Men Who Don't Work - Directed By: Alexander Atkins & Andrew Franks  
 Room Service - Directed By: Tariq Nasir  
 The Audition - Directed By: Matthew Toffolo  
 The Maiden and the Princess - Directed By: Ali Scher  
 Work Hard, Play Harder - Directed By: James Newman

Student Films  
 Christmas Reeve - Directed By: Mateusz Subieta  
 Look to the Cookie - Directed By: Lindsay Lindenbaum  
 Speak Out The Documentary - Directed By: Alex Vander Vlugt  
 The Monster - Directed By: Matthew Childs  
 Why Does God Hate Me? - Directed By: Joel Ashton McCarthy

Television Pilots  
 MILF Money - Directed By: Aaron Preist

References

International film awards
American film awards
Oceanian film awards
Culture of Honolulu